Dharmalingam Ethiraj (1 July 1934 – 11 December 2020) was an Indian footballer who represented India national team at the 1962 Asian Games and won a gold. Ethiraj joined the Indian Army in 1948 and served in the Madras Sappers. He played for Mysore and Services in the Santosh Trophy.

He died in December 2020 at the age of 86.

Honours

India
Asian Games Gold medal: 1962

Services
Santosh Trophy: 1960–61

MEG Bangalore
DCM Trophy runner-up: 1959

References

1934 births
2020 deaths
Footballers at the 1962 Asian Games
Indian footballers
Footballers from Bangalore
Medalists at the 1962 Asian Games
Asian Games gold medalists for India
Asian Games medalists in football
Association footballers not categorized by position